Francesco Zampano (born 30 September 1993) is an Italian professional footballer who plays as a full-back for  club Venezia.

Club career

Sampdoria 
Born in Genoa, Liguria along with his twin brother Giuseppe, they spent their youth career inside the Italian region. Giuseppe and Francesco both played for Genoese side U.C. Sampdoria's U17 team during the 2009–10 season.

Virtus Entella 
In the 2010–11 season both left for another Ligurian team Virtus Entella (named after the river). In the 2011–12 season Entella signed Francesco in a co-ownership deal for a peppercorn of €500, and Giuseppe returned to Sampdoria for their under-19 team. Francesco played for both first team and the U19 team for Entella. Among the defenders of Lega Pro who were born in 1991 or after, Francesco had the fourth highest average score of 6.24/10 ranked by La Gazzetta dello Sport, and was the best Lega Pro defender born in the 1993 age group. In June 2012, Sampdoria failed to buy back Alberto Masi and Francesco Zampano, both due to failing to give the highest price in a sealed bid to Lega Serie B. A.Masi and F.Zampano were the teammates who represented the team of Lega Pro.

Verona 
During summer 2013 he moved to Verona, and then became on loan to Juve Stabia.

Pescara 
After his loan period ended following the 2014–15 season, Zampano was loaned to Pescara, with an option to purchase. On 23 July 2015, Pescara signed Zampano outright.

On 16 August 2018, Zampano joined to Serie A team Frosinone on loan until 30 June 2019 with an obligation to buy.

Venezia
On 1 June 2022, Zampano signed a three-year contract with Venezia.

International career 
Francesco Zampano received his first national team call-up in his breakthrough 2011–12 season. Zampano scored a goal against the Italy U19 team when representing the Lega Pro U20 representative team in December 2011. Zampano made his debut for the Italy U19 side on 29 February 2012. He played all 3 games of the 2012 UEFA European Under-19 Football Championship elite qualification in May. He also received a call-up from the Lega Pro representative team for a youth tournament in Dubai in April, however, he did not play.

Career statistics

Notes

References

External links
 FIGC 
 Football.it Profile 

Living people
1993 births
Italian footballers
Association football defenders
Italy youth international footballers
U.C. Sampdoria players
Virtus Entella players
Hellas Verona F.C. players
S.S. Juve Stabia players
Delfino Pescara 1936 players
Udinese Calcio players
Frosinone Calcio players
Venezia F.C. players
Serie A players
Serie B players
Twin sportspeople
Footballers from Genoa